Frederic Kidder (April 16, 1804 – December 19, 1885) was an American author and antiquarian.  He was born in New Ipswich, New Hampshire, was mainly self-educated, and engaged in various business ventures in Boston and New York.  He made special researches into the history of early New England times and families.  He wrote:  
 The History of New Ipswich, a New Hampshire Town (1852)  
 The Expeditions of Captain John Lovewell (1865)  
 Military Operations in Eastern Maine and Nova Scotia during the Revolution (1867)  
 History of the First New Hampshire Regiment in the War of the Revolution (1868)  
 History of the Boston Massacre (1870)

Sources
The New England Historical and Genealogical Register, Volume 42, 1888

External links

 
 

1804 births
1885 deaths
People from New Ipswich, New Hampshire
19th-century American historians
19th-century American male writers
American male non-fiction writers